Northeast Jones High School (NEJ) is a public high school located in Jones County, Mississippi, United States, near the city of Laurel. Northeast Jones serves students in grades 7 through 12 and is one of three traditional high schools in the Jones County School District.

History
As part of a wider Jones County School District consolidation, Northeast Jones High School opened in 1965 as the product of three local high schools. After school integration in the United States, a black student was hanged in a bathroom and suffered non-fatal injuries. After a couple more years, black NEJ students rioted in 1972, drawing the National Guard to the school.

Athletics
Northeast Jones athletic teams are nicknamed the Tigers and compete in Mississippi High School Activities Association 4A Region 5. The football team won the 1996 MSHSAA Class 4A championship.

Performing arts
NEJ fields two competitive show choirs: the high school mixed-gender "Gold Horizons" and middle school mixed-gender "Tiger Vibe. The performing arts program also hosts an annual competition.

Notable alumni
 Marsha Blackburn, politician
Shad White, politician
Kenny Payne, American professional basketball coach and former player (https://en.wikipedia.org/wiki/Kenny_Payne)

References

Public high schools in Mississippi
Schools in Jones County, Mississippi
1965 establishments in Mississippi
Educational institutions established in 1965